Gaspar de Villarroel, O.S.A. (1587 – 15 October 1665) was a Roman Catholic prelate who served as Archbishop of La Plata o Charcas (1659–1665), Bishop of Arequipa (1651–1659), and Bishop of Santiago de Chile (1637–1651).

Biography
Luis Córdoba Ronquillo was born in Quito and ordained a priest in the Order of Saint Augustine. On 20 April 1637, he was appointed during the papacy of Pope Urban VIII as Bishop of Santiago de Chile. On 2 May 1638, he was consecrated bishop by Francisco de la Serna, Bishop of Popayán, with Father Pedro de Ortega y Sotomayor assisting. On 11 December 1651, he was appointed during the papacy of Pope Innocent X as Bishop of Arequipa. On January 1659, he was appointed during the papacy of Pope Alexander VII as Archbishop of La Plata o Charcas and installed in 1660. He served as Archbishop of La Plata o Charcas until his death on 15 October 1665.

References

External links and additional sources
 (for Chronology of Bishops) 
 (for Chronology of Bishops) 
 (for Chronology of Bishops) 
 (for Chronology of Bishops) 

17th-century Roman Catholic bishops in Chile
Bishops appointed by Pope Urban VIII
Bishops appointed by Pope Innocent X
Bishops appointed by Pope Alexander VII
1587 births
1665 deaths
Augustinian bishops
17th-century Roman Catholic bishops in Peru
17th-century Roman Catholic bishops in Bolivia
Roman Catholic bishops of Santiago de Chile
Roman Catholic bishops of Arequipa
Roman Catholic archbishops of Sucre